The siege of Buda in 1530 was a failed attempt to capture Buda from the Ottomans by Ferdinand I.

In 1529 Suleiman the Magnificent captured Buda and installed John Zápolya as his vassal. Ferdinand wanted to rule the entirety of the Kingdom of Hungary, as a result he attempted to occupy Buda which resulted in a siege that lasted from October to December in 1530.

The besiegers were hindered by the weather and by Gritti’s successful defence of the castle. Wilhelm von Roggendorf ordered an overall attack on 10 November. The siege was launched from three points,  from the north-east, the east and from the Gellért Hill in the south-west. The attack from the south-west was initially successful, however the defenders cleverly mobilised the reserves they had set up and drove back the attackers. An advance of Ottoman relief troops was reported on 20 November, the Habsburg offensive was cancelled and the army set out back to Vienna on 22 November. It can be concluded that the attackers withdrew in panic as their sick and injured soldiers were captured by the men of John Zápolya who had them massacred.

References

Battles involving the Ottoman Empire